Charlottetown Airport  is located  north of Charlottetown, Prince Edward Island, Canada. The airport is currently run by the Charlottetown Airport Authority, is owned by Transport Canada and forms part of the National Airports System.

The airport is classified as an airport of entry by NAV CANADA and is staffed by the Canada Border Services Agency. CBSA officers at this airport can handle aircraft with no more than 60 passengers or 368 if off-loaded in stages.

History

Upton Field
The first aircraft to operate in the Charlottetown area was one that landed at the exhibition grounds east of the city's central business district in 1912; it was not until 1931 that a permanent airfield was built. The first facility was known as Upton Field (later Upton Airport) and consisted of two turf runways  and  respectively, opening on January 16, 1932. Upton was a farm located in the western part of Queens Royalty, northwest of the city proper. The airfield was leased to Canadian Airways Limited from October 9, 1932, to October 9, 1938, although the airfield was only licensed until June 30, 1938. Throughout this time, Upton Airport received the first air mail service in Canada.

Today the site is farmland and trees, and a popular area for walking dogs, hiking, cross country skiing, and other recreational activities.

Municipal ownership and operation
In June 1938 the city government asked the Department of Transport to assist in the development of an expanded municipal airport. Upton Airport was considered a candidate, as was a  property east of Sherwood Station on the Brackley Point Road. Upton Airport was rejected due to lack of space and the Sherwood Station property in the central part of Charlottetown Royalty was purchased by the city government for $30,000. The provincial government contributed 50% to the development of the new airport in exchange for 50% of its profits while the city would operate it.

Military operation

In December 1939 the city government offered the airport to the federal government for military use through the duration of World War II. The Royal Canadian Air Force expanded the airport and enlarged the runways in preparation for using the airport to train pilots and aircrew. The runways were altered into a classic triangle configuration seen with most British Commonwealth Air Training Plan aerodromes across Canada. The Royal Air Force used the airfield from June 15, 1941, until February 1944 during which time it was known as RAF Station Charlottetown. Following the departure of the RAF, the RCAF established training units at the airfield, which was renamed RCAF Station Charlottetown.

Federal ownership and operation

Following the end of World War II, the military presence at the airport diminished by late 1945 and the base was decommissioned and transferred from the RCAF to the federal Department of Transport on February 1, 1946, returning the airfield to civilian use.

Several expansions were subsequently undertaken, including an enlarged civilian air terminal off the Brackley Point Road on the west side of the airfield, as well as a lengthening and realigning of what would become runway 03/21 during the 1960s-1970s to accommodate jet aircraft. A major expansion during the 1980s saw the old terminal become a general aviation facility after a new terminal, control tower and emergency services building were constructed further to the north from a continuation of the Sherwood Road. This also saw runway 03/21 lengthened to its current configuration.

Charlottetown Airport saw extensive service during the 1960s-1990s from both Air Canada and Eastern Provincial Airways (EPA) to destinations in Atlantic and Central Canada. Following EPA's sale and merger with CP Air, Charlottetown Airport saw direct CP Air service from Central Canada for several years, continued by Canadian. The creation of Air Canada subsidiary Air Nova and Canadian subsidiary Air Atlantic saw the beginning of a downgrade in direct service by the major carriers from Central Canada and an increase in service from hub airports such as Halifax and Moncton.

The opening of the Confederation Bridge in 1997 coupled with capacity improvements at Moncton and Halifax airports saw many changes to air traffic through Charlottetown.

Charlottetown Airport Authority
On February 28, 1999, the Department of Transport transferred operational and financial responsibility for the Charlottetown Airport to the Charlottetown Airport Authority under a 60-year lease arrangement; the federal government through DOT remains the owner of the property.

Since the turn of the millennium, and especially since the mid-2000s, Charlottetown Airport has seen a considerable increase in the number of flights. The trend started when Air Canada introduced non-stop flights to Montreal-Trudeau Airport from Charlottetown after the acquisition of Canadian Airlines. JetsGo introduced non-stop flights from Charlottetown in early 2003. The flights didn't last long, as JetsGo declared bankruptcy and shut down in March 2005.

With the recent completion of a $2.2 million expansion that includes customs facilities, Delta Air Lines had added flights to Charlottetown from New York; however, Delta is not serving the airport at the present time. As well, work has been completed to expand the main terminal's apron to accommodate more scheduled flights on the ground at the same time.

In 2016–17 the Charlottetown Airport Authority made a major expansion to runway 10/28 to have two 7000 ft runways. 10/28 reopened in late summer 2017.

Airlines and destinations

Passenger

Historical passenger airline service: 1960s-2000s

Eastern Provincial Airways served the airport during the 1960s with Douglas DC-3 prop aircraft and Handley Page Dart Herald turboprop aircraft. By 1970, Eastern Provincial had introduced jet service with Boeing 737-200 aircraft and was operating non-stop 737 flights to Halifax and Montreal as well as direct, no change of plane 737 service to Sydney, NS, Deer Lake, NL, Gander, NL and St. John's, NL.

In 1975, Eastern Provincial Airlines was the only airline operating scheduled flights into the airport with non-stop Boeing 737-200 jet service from Halifax and Montreal as well as non-stop Handley Page Dart Herald turboprop service from Halifax, the Magdalen Islands and Moncton.

According to the Official Airline Guide (OAG), a second airline was serving the airport by early 1976: Air Canada operating non-stop McDonnell Douglas DC-9-30 jet service from Ottawa with these flights also providing one stop direct, no change of plane service from Toronto.
This same OAG also lists Eastern Provincial's flights with Boeing 737-200 jet service being operated on the same routes with the airline also having replaced its Handley Page Dart Herald aircraft with Hawker Siddeley HS 748 turboprops by this time.

Air Canada and Eastern Provincial were continuing to serve the airport during the early 1980s with Air Canada operating one daily nonstop to Ottawa with a McDonnell Douglas DC-9-30 with this flight continuing on to Toronto while Eastern Provincial was operating one daily nonstop flight to Montreal with a Boeing 737-200. However, by early 1985, Eastern Provincial, while continuing to serve the airport, was no longer operating nonstop flights to Montreal from Charlottetown. Eastern Provincial then merged with CP Air in 1986 to form Canadian Pacific Air Lines and successor Canadian Airlines was continuing to operate Boeing 737-200 jet service from the airport during the late 1980s.

In the late summer of 1994, three airlines were serving Charlottetown: Air Canada with one daily mainline DC-9-30 jet flight from Toronto which made an en route stop at Moncton, Air Nova operating code sharing service for Air Canada with six non-stop flights from Halifax operated every weekday flown with de Havilland Canada DHC-8 Dash 8 turboprop aircraft and Air Atlantic operating code sharing service for Canadian Airlines with seven non-stop flights from Halifax every weekday also flown with Dash 8 aircraft. According to the OAG, Air Nova and Air Atlantic were also operating direct, no change of plane Dash 8 service into Charlottetown from Boston, Moncton and Saint John, NB with Air Nova operating direct Dash 8 flights from Fredericton, NB, Quebec City and Yarmouth, NS as well while Canadian Airlines was no longer operating mainline jet service into the airport at this time in 1994. By 1995, two airlines were operating non-stop service from the airport to Toronto with each air carrier operating one daily flight: Air Canada with Canadair CRJ regional jet service and Atlantic Island Airways with Fokker F28 Fellowship jet service. In 1999, Air Canada was operating its daily mainline non-stop flight to Toronto with a DC-9-30 jet while at the same time Royal Aviation was operating one non-stop flight a week to Toronto with a Boeing 757-200 jet.

During the summer of 2003, Jetsgo, a startup air carrier which flew Fokker 100 and McDonnell Douglas MD-80 jets, was operating three nonstop flights a week to Toronto and one nonstop flight a week to Montreal.

References

External links

Charlottetown Airport website
Page about this airport on COPA's Places to Fly airport directory

Certified airports in Prince Edward Island
Transport in Charlottetown
Buildings and structures in Charlottetown
National Airports System